Weihe may refer to:

Aircraft
DFS Weihe, glider
Focke-Wulf Fw 58, advanced trainer

People with the surname
Carl Ernst August Weihe (1779–1834), German botanist and physician
Podge Weihe (1862–1914), Major League Baseball player

Places
Wei He, a tributary of the Yellow River in China
Weihe, Heilongjiang (苇河), a town in Shangzhi, Heilongjiang, China
Weihe (Werra), a river in central Germany
Weihe Viaduct, bridge of the A4 motorway near Richelsdorf, Germany